The 1941 Pacific hurricane season ran through the summer and fall of 1941. Before the satellite age started in the 1960s, data on east Pacific hurricanes was extremely unreliable. Most east Pacific storms were of no threat to land. 1941 season was the last season before Monthly Weather Review stopped publishing temporarily due to World War II.

Systems

Tropical Storm One
It possibly headed northeast, towards Cape Corrientes, as a tropical cyclone was spotted in that direction on July 6. However, it is possible that these observations were actually of two different tropical cyclones.

Tropical Cyclone Two
A tropical cyclone was spotted on July 15, south of Mexico. The next day, another cyclone was spotted further to the west. On July 18, weather possibly associated with a tropical cyclone was reported south of Cabo San Lucas. It is unknown whether either one of these two latter observations are of the same system as reported on July 15.

Possible Tropical Cyclone Three
On July 21, a possible tropical cyclone was detected.

Tropical Cyclone Four
On August 16, a tropical cyclone formed well off the coast of Mexico. It tracked generally northwest, and dissipated in the central Pacific north-northeast of the Hawaiian Islands on August 24.

Hurricane Five

A tropical storm was first reported on September 8. The storm quickly intensified, becoming a mid-level tropical storm the next day. It slowly moved northwestward, and entered the Gulf of California. The hurricane was last observed on September 12.

Strong winds and heavy rain lashed the southern tip of the Baja California Peninsula for 48 hours, lasting until late September 12. The wind destroyed poorer sections of La Paz and nearby villages. Two villages, Santiago and Triunfo, were completely destroyed. The torrential rains damaged many highways across the peninsula and left thousands homeless. The tuna canning industry declined rapidly in San José del Cabo.

The port town of Cabo San Lucas was washed away and mostly destroyed due to flooding Furthermore, "great loss of life" was reported. Initially following the system, activity among surrounding areas of the village ceased. As of 1966, this tropical cyclone is regarded as one of the worst storms to affect the city.

Throughout the peninsula, 15 people were killed, and many were injured. According to press reports from Mexico City, the hurricane was considered the worst system to affect the state since the dawn of the 20th century. From September 16 to 22, cloudiness and showers were reported along the southern portion of the state.

Hurricane Six and Seven
A storm was first spotted September 17, and another was reported nearby the next day. These two systems then merged. The combined tropical cyclone subsequently became a very intense hurricane on September 19. At that time, the low was the strongest hurricane in the basin since 1939 and second strongest ever recorded. The hurricane then weakened, and entered the Gulf of California on September 20, at which point it was lost track of by meteorologists.

Tropical Disturbance Eight
Later in the month, from September 21 to September 24, a tropical disturbance was noted south of the Mexican coast, but failed to develop further.

Tropical Storm Nine
A tropical storm was reported on November 2 and 4.

Tropical Storm Ten
Another tropical storm was detected on November 3. It was reportedly very small. This cyclone was unusually close to the equator, at latitude 7°30.

See also

1941 Atlantic hurricane season
1941 Pacific typhoon season
1940s North Indian Ocean cyclone seasons
 1900–1950 South-West Indian Ocean cyclone seasons
 1940s Australian region cyclone seasons

References

1941 in Mexico
Pacific hurricane seasons
1940s Pacific hurricane seasons